The 2021 Eastern Washington Eagles football team represented Eastern Washington University as a member of the Big Sky Conference during the 2021 NCAA Division I FCS football season. Led by fifth-year head coach Aaron Best, the Eagles played their home games at Roos Field in Cheney, Washington.

Previous season

The Eagles finished the 2020–21 season with an overall record of 5–2 and a mark of 5–1 in conference play to place second in the Big Sky. They received an at-large bid to the FCS playoffs, where they lost to North Dakota State in the first round.

Preseason

Polls
On July 26, 2021, during the virtual Big Sky Kickoff, the Eagles were predicted to finish third in the Big Sky by both the coaches and media.

Preseason All–Big Sky team
The Eagles had four players selected to the preseason all-Big Sky team.

Offense

Eric Barriere – QB

Talolo Limu-Jones – WR

Tristen Taylor – OT

Defense

Mitchell Johnson – DE

Schedule

Game summaries

at UNLV

Central Washington

at Western Illinois

at Southern Utah

No. 4 Montana

at Northern Colorado

Idaho

Weber State

No. 4 Montana State

at No. 6 UC Davis

at Portland State

FCS Playoffs

Northern Iowa–First Round

at No. 5 Montana–Second Round

Ranking movements

References

Eastern Washington
Eastern Washington Eagles football seasons
2021 NCAA Division I FCS playoff participants
Eastern Washington Eagles football